Bergen National Opera in Bergen, Norway, originally called Den Nye Opera (the new opera) is a foundation established in 2005 by the Bergen Philharmonic Orchestra, Den Nationale Scene, Grieghallen and the Bergen International Festival. In 2007 Opera Vest became a part of the foundation, which aims to be the regional opera company for Western Norway. The name Bergen Nasjonale Opera was used from 2012.

In addition to professional opera, Bergen National Opera also runs participatory programs for children, teenagers and young adults. BNO is based in Grieghallen in the city of Bergen. 

The foundation is supported by the Ministry of Culture, the Vestland county, the city of Bergen, and private supporters.

Artistic directors 
 2005 - 2007 Stein Olav Henrichsen
 2007 - 2010 Stein Olav Henrichsen
 2010 - 2020 Mary Miller
 2021 - Eivind Gullberg Jensen

Main partners 
Bergen National Opera's main partners are
 Bergen Philharmonic Orchestra
 Edvard Grieg Korene

Children and young adults
Bergen National Opera runs several projects for children and teenagers in schools.

The Summer Academy "Opera by fjord" at Oseana is arranged every year since 2021, and is now for young singers, orchestra musicians, conductors and repetiteurs over 18.

Programme

Season of 2006 
 Tosca (Giacomo Puccini / Luigi Illica / Giuseppe Giacosa) Grieghallen

Season of 2007/08 
 The Man Who Mistook His Wife for a Hat (Michael Nyman) Sandnes Kulturhus, Bodø Kulturhus
 Lirendreieren (Magne Hegdal) Oslo Nye Trikkestallen. Co-production with Opera Sør
 Carmen (Georges Bizet / Henri Meilhac / Ludovic Halévy) Grieghallen
 L'Amour de loin (Kaija Saariaho / Amin Maalouf) Grieghallen
 Die Walküre (Richard Wagner) Grieghallen

Season of 2008/09 
 Melancholia (Georg Friedrich Haas / Jon Fosse) Grieghallen
 Der fliegende Holländer (Richard Wagner) Grieghallen
 Sounds Like You (Bent Sørensen / Peter Asmussen) Grieghallen – Première
 Bluebeard's Castle (Béla Bartók / Béla Balázs) Grieghallen
 Die Dreigroschenoper (Bertolt Brecht / Kurt Weill) Grieghallen – Berliner Ensemble
 Eugene Onegin (Pyotr Ilyich Tchaikovsky) Bergenhus Fortress

Season of 2009/10 
 Cinderella (Vladimir Tarnopolsky / Roald Dahl, oversatt av Klaus Hagerup) Grieghallen
 Hypermusikal (Glenn Erik Haugland / Heidi Tronsmo)  / Fjellheimen / Radøyhallen – Première
 Opera gala with Barbara Frittoli, Grieghallen
 Ophelias: Death by Water Singing (Henrik Hellstenius) Teatr Wielki, Poland
 The Marriage of Figaro (Wolfgang Amadeus Mozart) Grieghallen
 Anne Pedersdotter (Edvard Fliflet Bræin / Hans Kristiansen) Bergenhus Fortress
 La traviata (Giuseppe Verdi / Francesco Maria Piave) Bergenhus Fortress

Season of 2010/11 
 Veslefrikk (Knut Vaage / Torgeir Rebolledo Pedersen) Kulturhuset i Tromsø / Den Nationale Scene / National Theatre of Szeged, Hungary – Première
 Alpha and More, guest performance by the Polish National Ballet
 La bohème (Giacomo Puccini / Luigi Illica / Giuseppe Giacosa) Grieghallen
 The Tales of Hoffmann (Jacques Offenbach / Jules Barbier / Michel Carré) Grieghallen
 Hypermusikal (Glenn Erik Haugland / Heidi Tronsmo) Oslo Opera House
 Oedipus rex (Igor Stravinsky / Jean Cocteau) Grieghallen
 Hänsel und Gretel (Engelbert Humperdinck) Grieghallen

Season of 2011/12 
 A New Requiem (Wolfgang Amadeus Mozart / Christian Köhler / Jeroen Brouwers) Bodø Kulturhus / Peer Gynt Theatre, Grieghallen / Sandnes Kulturhus / Brygga Kultursal, Halden
 Siegfried (Richard Wagner) Grieghallen
 L'Étoile (Emmanuel Chabrier) Grieghallen
 Pelléas et Mélisande (Claude Debussy) Logen Teater
 Xerxes (George Frideric Handel) Grieghallen
 La Cenerentola (Gioachino Rossini) Grieghallen

Season of 2012/13 
 The Cunning Little Vixen (Leoš Janáček) Grieghallen
 Marco Polo (Tan Dun) Grieg Hall
 Alt om min familie Logen Teater
 Fidelio (Ludwig van Beethoven) Grieghallen

Season of 2013/14
 The Golden Cockerel (Nikolaj Rimskij-Korsakov) Grieghallen
 Voices and Votes (Orlando Gough) Grieghallen
 Påske (Gisle Kverndokk) Logen Teater

Season of 2014/15
 Aida (Giuseppe Verdi) Grieghallen
 Folie à Deux (Emily Hall / Sjón) USF Verftet
 Don Giovanni (Wolfgang Amadeus Mozart) Grieg Hall
 St. Mark Passion (J.S. Bach) Bergen Domkirke

Season of 2015/16
 Mimí Goes Glamping - Operafestival at Åmot Operagard / Villa Åmot
 Madama Butterfly (Giacomo Puccini) Grieghallen
 Verklärte Nacht / Erwartung (Arnold Schönberg) Grieghallen
 It's all true (Travis Just) Cornerteateret

Season of 2016/17
 Mimí Goes Glamping - Operafestival at Åmot Operagard / Villa Åmot
 Dama til Mozart (Thomas Guthrie) Tour
 Eli synger Ella - Concert at DNS
 I Capuleti e i Montecchi (Vincenzo Bellini) Grieghallen
 Sae-Kyung Rim, Mari Eriksmoen, Magnus Staveland, Marianne Beate Kielland - Recitals in Håkonshallen
 Private View (Annelies Van Parys / Jen Hadfield) Cornerteateret
 Il turco in Italia (Gioacchino Rossini) Grieghallen
 Peter Grimes (Benjamin Britten) Grieg Hall / Edinburgh International Festival
 Messiah (Georg Friedrich Händel) DNS

Season of 2017/18
 Paperbag Princess (Robert Munsch) Åmot Operagard / Ulvsnesøy / Fjaler
 Mimí Goes Glamping - Operafestival at Åmot Operagard / Villa Åmot
 Hansel and Gretel (Engelbert Humperdinck) Tour 
 Otello (Giuseppe Verdi) Grieghallen
 Lise Davidsen - Concert in Aulaen
 Kristina Mkhitaryan, Rame Lahaj, Marita Sølberg - Recitals in Håkonshallen
 Future Opera (Rebecka Ahvenniemi, Øyvind Mæland, Lars Skoglund)
 The Flying Dutchman (Richard Wagner) Grieghallen

Season of 2018/19
 Carmen (Georges Bizet) Terminus Hall
 Candide (Leonard Bernstein) Grieghallen
 Latonia Moore, Lester Lynch - Recital at DNS
 Werther (Jules Massenet) Grieghallen

Season of 2019/20 
 Sweeney Todd (Stephen Sondheim)
 La clemenza di Tito (W.A. Mozart) Grieghallen / Cancelled due to Covid-19 lockdown
 Salome (Richard Strauss) Grieghallen / Cancelled due to Covid-19 lockdown
 Future Opera (Bára Gísladóttir / Peder Barratt-Due) / Cancelled due to Covid-19 lockdown
 This Evening's Performance Has Not Been Cancelled (Zoë Irvine) / in collaboration with Bergen International Festival
 Carmen (Bizet) / Movie inspired by the opera by Bizet

Season of 2020/21 
 Macbeth (Verdi) Grieghallen / Cancelled due to Covid-19 lockdown
 La clemenza di Tito (W.A. Mozart) Grieghallen
 Last chapter / Festival

Season of 2021/22 
 Opera by the Fjord - Concert at Oseana (August 2021)
 Rusalka (Antonín Dvořák) Grieghallen / Cancelled due to strike in the cultural sector 
 Operetta Concert at DNS
 The Merry Widow (Lehár) Grieghallen
 Opera by the Fjord - Concert at Oseana (July 2022)

Season of 2022/23 
 Triple Mozart - Concert at DNS
 The Magic Flute (W.A. Mozart) Grieghallen
 Amahl and the Night Visitors (Menotti) - Grieghallen (Peer Gynt)
 Rusalka (Antonín Dvořák) Grieghallen

References

External links

Norwegian opera companies
2005 establishments in Norway
Musical groups established in 2005
Arts organizations established in 2005